Crossingpoint was a South African-based Hardcore punk band, formed in 1998.

They are widely accepted as being the longest running South African Hardcore group, and have in turn inspired many more hardcore bands throughout the South-African music scene. Today, they play a breed of heavy metal, rock and punk, combined with a positive message in their lyrics. The first incarnation of the band had lyrics by the founding vocalist Wesley van Eeden that dealt with sexism, animal cruelty and personal responsibility. Current vocalist Raymond Douglas sings songs that focus more on personal and spiritual issues that he has dealt with.

Popularity 

Despite not being on a major music label, the band managed to become popular, not only in South Africa, but also internationally. As of July 2006, Crossingpoint have embarked on an American tour, with shows in Illinois, Michigan, Indiana, New York, Philadelphia, Virginia and Georgia.

They have toured South Africa with international bands like : Underoath, Haste the Day, CDC, No Turning Back, and more.

Crossingpoint also become (intentionally, or not) standard-bearers for the Straight edge movement in South Africa - All members of the band are straight edge. Furthermore, guitarist Brandon van Eeden appeared in South African youth magazine Blunt, in an article detailing his straight edge lifestyle, a life of abstinence from drugs and alcohol.

Crossingpoint played their last show on 24 July 2010
(https://web.archive.org/web/20100720214647/http://www.crossingpoint.co.za/2010/07/24/the-last-show-durban-kzn-sat-24-jul-10/)
A show review is here: http://www.speakerbox.co.za/content/feature.aspx?id=431

External links 
Crossingpoint.co.za
mySpace.com Page
Purevolume.com Page

South African rock music groups
Musicians from Durban
Musical groups established in 1998